Burkillanthus is a monotypic genus of flowering plants in the citrus family, Rutaceae, containing the single species Burkillanthus malaccensis. It is native to Sumatra in Indonesia. It is also native to the Malay Peninsula and Sarawak in Malaysia, but it is extirpated from the peninsula and in Sarawak it was only known from a single specimen collected in 1961. Its common name is Malay ghostlime.

This species is part of the same subfamily (Aurantioideae), tribe (Citreae), and subtribe (Citrinae), as genus Citrus, and as such, it is known technically as a citrus fruit tree. It grows singly or in small groups in primary and secondary forest habitat.

References

Vulnerable plants
Trees of Sumatra
Trees of Borneo
Aurantioideae
Aurantioideae genera
Monotypic Rutaceae genera
Taxonomy articles created by Polbot